Al-Khaburah is a Wilayah (province) in Al Batinah North Governorate, Oman. As of 2010 it had a population of 42,119.

References

Al Batinah North Governorate